Tourcoing Lille Métropole Volley-Ball is a sport association. The volley-ball section was created in 1912 in Tourcoing. The main team is playing in the French main league, called "LNV Ligue A".

Honours & achievements

Domestic competitions
French League
2005: 2nd of the regular season, semi finals in playoffs
2004: 3rd of the regular season, semi finals in playoffs
2003: 2nd of the regular season, semi finals in playoffs
2002: 6th of the regular season, Vice-champion de France
2001: 3rd of the regular season, Vice-champion de France
2000: 2nd of the regular season, semi finals in playoffs

French Cup
2005: Finalist
2004: 3rd
2003: Finalist
2001: Finalist
1999: Finalist
1998: Finalist

European competitions
CEV Cup
2005: 3rd
2003: 4th

Roster

Season 2006-2007
Head Coach : Marcelo Fronckowiak

External links
 Official Website 
 Team profile at Volleybox.net

French volleyball clubs
Sport in Lille
Volleyball clubs established in 1965
1965 establishments in France